The 1987 Holy Cross Crusaders football team was an American football team that represented the College of the Holy Cross as a member of the Colonial League during the 1987 NCAA Division I-AA football season. In its second year under head coach Mark Duffner, the team compiled an 11–0 record (4–0 against conference opponents) and won the Colonial League championship. The team played its home games at Fitton Field in Worcester, Massachusetts.

Schedule

References

Holy Cross
Holy Cross Crusaders football seasons
Patriot League football champion seasons
College football undefeated seasons
Holy Cross Crusaders football